Girl gang may refer to:

Girl Gang, American crime film
"Girl Gang" (Ciara song), song by Ciara featuring on her album Beauty Marks
Girl Gang Boss Detective: Revenge of the Three Kazama Sisters, Japanese film

Disambiguation pages